Carlos Santiago  (born December 9, 1977) is a judoka from Puerto Rico. He competed in the 2000 Summer Olympics.

References 

 

1977 births
Living people
Judoka at the 2011 Pan American Games
Puerto Rican male judoka
Olympic judoka of Puerto Rico
Judoka at the 2000 Summer Olympics
Pan American Games competitors for Puerto Rico
20th-century Puerto Rican people
21st-century Puerto Rican people